California's 28th congressional district is a congressional district in the U.S. state of California, in Los Angeles County.

Following redistricting ahead of the 2022 election cycle, the 18th district was relocated to the San Gabriel Valley.

Formerly, from 2003 to 2013, the district included about half of the San Fernando Valley, including North Hollywood, in the Greater Los Angeles Area. Due to redistricting after the 2010 United States Census, the district shifted east within Los Angeles County and includes portions of Burbank and Glendale.

Competitiveness

In statewide races

Composition

As of the 2020 redistricting, California's 28th congressional district is located in Southern California. It encompasses most of north eastern Los Angeles County, and part of the eastern border of San Bernardino. A majority of the district is taken up by Angeles National Forest.

Los Angeles County is split between this district, the 23rd district, the 30th district, the 31st district, the 34th district, the 35th district, and the 38th district. The 28th and 23rd are partitioned by Angeles National Forest and Juniper Hills Rd.

The 28th and 30th are partitioned by Angeles National Forest, Big Tujunga Creek, Big Tujunga Canyon Rd, Silver Creek, Markridge Rd, Pennsylvania Ave, Northwoods Ln, Ramsdell Ave, Fairway Ave, La Crescenta Ave, Mayfield Ave, Rosemont Ave, Florencita Ave, Thompson Ct, Park Pl, Verdugo Blvd, La Tour Way, Descanso Gardens, Norham Pl, Wendover Rd, Linda Vista Ave, Oak Grove Dr, Yucca Ln, W Montana St, Vermont St, Forest Ave, Wyoming St, Lincoln Ave, Anderson Pl, Canada Pl, Highway 210, W Hammond St, Glen Ave, W Mountain St, Manzanita Ave, N Orange Grove Blvd, and Ventura Freeway.

The 28th and 31st are partitioned by Rio Hondo River, Garvey Ave, Highway 19, Highway 10, Eaton Wash, Temple City Blvd, Valley Blvd, Ellis Ln, Lower Azusa Rd, Grande Ave, Santa Anita Ave, Lynrose St, Flood Control Basin, Peck Rd, Randolph St, Cogswell Rd, Clark St, Durfree Ave, Santa Anita Wash, S 10th Ave, Jeffries Ave, Mayflower/Fairgreen Ave, Alta Vista/Fairgreen Ave, El Norte Ave, S 5th Ave, Valencia Way/N 5th Ave, Hillcrest Blvd, E Hillcrest Blvd, Grand Ave, E Greystone Ave, N Bradoaks Ave, Angeles National Forest, W Fork Rd, Highway 39, Cedar Creek, Iron Fork, Glendora Mountain Rd, Morris Reservoir, W Sierra Madre Ave, N Lorraine Ave, E Foothill Blvd, E Carroll Ave, Steffen St, S Lorraine Ave, AT and SF Railway, E Route 66, N Cataract Ave, San Dimas Canyon Rd, Clayton Ct, Live Oak Canyon, Rotary Dr, Highway 30, Williams Ave, Highway 210, Garey Ave, and Summer Ave.

The 28th and 34th are partitioned by Colorado Blvd, Lantana Dr, Church St, Adelaide Pl, Highway 110, N Huntingdon Dr, S Winchester Ave, Valley Blvd, Laguna Channel, Highway 710, l-10 Express Ln, Rollins Dr, Floral Dr, E Colonia, Belvedere Park, Highway 60, S Atlantic Blvd, and Pomona Blvd.

The 28th and 35th are partitioned by Towne Ave, Harrison Ave, Carnegie Ave, W Arrow Highway, Mountain Ave, and E American Ave.

The 28th and 38th are partitioned by E Pomona Blvd, Potrero Grande Dr, Arroyo Dr, Hill Dr, Montebello Blvd, N San Gabriel Blvd, and Walnut Grove Ave. The 28th takes in the north side of the cities of Glendora and Monrovia, the cities of Pasadena, Alhambra, Monterey Park, Arcadia, Glendora, Rosemead, San Gabriel, Claremont, Temple City, and La Cañada Flintridge, as well as the census-designated place Altadena.

San Bernardino County is split between this district, the 23rd district, the 33rd district, and the 35th district. They are partitioned by San Bernardino National Forest, Manzanita Rd, Highway 15, Cajon Blvd, W Kenwood Ave, Highway 215, W Meyers Rd, Ohio Ave, Pine Ave, Bailey Ct, Highway 206, Devils Canyon Rd, Cloudland Truck Trail, Cloudland Cutoff, Hill Dr, W 54th St, E Hill Dr, Bonita Vista Dr, Sterling Ave, Argyle Ave, E Marshall Blvd, Rockford Ave, Lynwood Dr, La Praix St, Orchid Dr, Denair Ave, Highland Ave, Orchard Rd, Arroyo Vista Dr, Church St, Greensport Rd, Florida St, Garnet St, Nice Ave, Crafton Ave, 5th Ave, Walnut St, 6th Ave, S Wabash Ave, E Citrus Ave, N Church St, Southern California Regional Rail A, Tennessee St, Highway 10, California St, E Washington St, and S Barton Rd. The 28th district takes in the north side of the cities of Upland and Rancho Cucamonga.

Cities & CDP with 10,000 or more people
 Rancho Cucamonga - 174,453
 Pasadena - 138,699
 Alhambra - 82,868
 Upland - 79,040
 Monterey Park - 61,096
 Arcadia - 56,681
 Glendora - 52,558
 Rosemead - 51,185
 Altadena - 42,846
 San Gabriel - 39,568
 Claremont - 37,266
 Temple City - 36,494
 South Pasadena - 26,897
 La Cañada Flintridge - 20,573

List of members representing the district

Election results

1952

1954

1956

1958

1960

1962

1964

1966

1968

1970

1972

1974

1976

1978

1980

1982

1984

1986

1988

1990

1992

1994

1996

1998

2000

2002

2004

2006

2008

2010

2012

2014

2016

2018

2020

See also
List of United States congressional districts

References

External links
GovTrack.us: California's 28th congressional district
RAND California Election Returns: District Definitions

28
Government of Los Angeles County, California
Government of Los Angeles
Burbank, California
Crescenta Valley
Echo Park, Los Angeles
East Hollywood, Los Angeles
Glendale, California
Hollywood, Los Angeles
Hollywood Hills
La Cañada Flintridge, California
Los Angeles River
Los Feliz, Los Angeles
North Hollywood, Los Angeles
Pasadena, California
San Fernando Valley
San Gabriel Mountains
Santa Monica Mountains
Silver Lake, Los Angeles
Sun Valley, Los Angeles
Sunland-Tujunga, Los Angeles
Verdugo Mountains
West Hollywood, California
Constituencies established in 1953
1953 establishments in California